Kumarsain Assembly constituency was one of the 68 constituencies until 2008 delimitation in the Himachal Pradesh Legislative Assembly of Himachal Pradesh state in India. It  was a segment of Simla Lok Sabha constituency. It included areas of Kumarsain tehsil and Sunni tehsil of Shimla district. Post 2008 delimitation, Kumarsain tehsil became part of Theog Assembly constituency and Sunni tehsil became part of Shimla Rural Assembly constituency.

Member of Legislative Assembly

Election results

2007

See also
 Shimla district
 List of constituencies of Himachal Pradesh Legislative Assembly
 Theog Assembly constituency
 Kumarsain

References

External links
HP official website of the Chief Electoral Officer

Former assembly constituencies of Himachal Pradesh
Shimla district